Special Units Command of FARAJA ( Yegānhā-ye vīzheh-ye pāsdārān-e FARAJA), acronymed YEGUP, is a subdivision of Law Enforcement Command of the Islamic Republic of Iran in charge of its special forces.

The FARAJA Special Units were involved in the post-election protest suppression in 2009 and have forcefully put down multiple nationwide protests.

History 
Iranian Police Special Units were established in 1991, after the disbanding of the previous law enforcement forces and the establishment of the then-Law Enforcement Force of the Islamic Republic of Iran.

The Special Units, with roots in the Islamic Revolution Committees, were led by Mojtaba Abdollahi from their establishment until 2012.

The Special were deployed for the first time in Mashhad in 1992. In 1994, the Special Units quelled riots in Qazvin, and in 1995 they confronted a major protest by bus and truck drivers in Eslamshahr. In 1999 Special Units were involved in confronting the 1999 protest movement.

The disputed 2009 Iranian presidential election led to the 2009 Iranian presidential election protests and to the massive deployment of Special Units.

In 2012, Mojtaba Abdollahi left the command to Second Brigadier General Hassan Karami. During massive nationwide protests that rocked Iran between December 2017 and January 2018, the Special Units were again massively deployed.

In on 7 December 2021, Iranian Police Special Units were sanctioned by the United States.

Role 
The Iranian police special units command groups units and organizations tasked with crowd and riot control and protest suppression.

Organization 
The Special Units Command consists of riot units as well as of specialist units for hostage rescue, mounted police, riot police, police dog, airborne, etc.

The Special Units Command headquarters are in Tehran, and its commander is Brigadier General Hasan Karami since 2012. The number of Special Units Command troops has never been disclosed. According to Brigadier General Karami, 20,000 troops were deployed to provide security to the Arba'een ceremony in 2019.

Individual special units throughout Iran depend on the Special Units Command for administrative and training purposes. Nearly half of the personnel of the Special Units are based in Tehran, either in the national-level units and in the Tehran provincial Special Unit.

National-level units 
There are three Special Units with tasks extending to the whole Iranian territory. These units have names dwawn from Shia tradition: Mûsâ ibn Ja‘far, Imam Hussein, and Amīr al-Mu'minīn. 
 1st Amir al-Momenin Brigade: based in Tehran;
 2nd Musa Bin Jafar Brigade: based in Tehran;
 3rd Imam Hossein Brigade: based in Tehran.

1st Amir al-Momenin Brigade 
The 1st Amir al-Momenin Brigade is considered the premier Special Unit within FARAJA. The operational jurisdiction is the whole national territory of Iran. Its headquarters are in Afsarieh, Tehran. Currently, the command of the 1st Amir al-Momenin Brigade is under the responsibility of Colonel Yahya Hasikhani.

Territorial organization 
A Special unit exists in all the 31 provinces of Iran.  The special unit is under the operational control of the police command of the relevant province and, in terms of training and general command, under the national-level command.

In Tehran area, the special units are under the operational control of the police command in charge for Greater Tehran. There are three units based in Tehran:
 4th Imam Khomeini Brigade: based in Tehran, its operational area is Greater Tehran;
 Special unit of the special police command in the West of Tehran province (Shahriar);
 Special unit of special police command of East Tehran province (Javadabad and Varamin).

Subordinate units 
Under the Iranian Police Special Units Command there are some specialist units:
 Police tactical unit: Counter-terrorism Special Force (NOPO);
 Mounted police (ASVARAN);
 K-9 unit: Crowd Control Police Dogs (SAPCA).
 Women's unit;
 Police paratroopers unit;
 Explosive Disposal Unit.

Operational approach 
The operational approach of the Special Units is complex and it involves and integrated cooperation with other FARAJA branches, as well as other governmental or quasi-governmental organizations. Overall, the ultimate aim is to anticipate and prevent, or neutralise, protests and their potential harm.

Riot-control operations are organised according the intelligence-led policing model, with special attention placed on demography and geography of the target areas, as well as potential tactical threats posed by the operation with specific regard to the operational area itself.

According to Brigadier General Hassan Karami, Commander of the Special Units Command, the tactical approach of riot police forces is to conduct ostensive patrols while fully equipped and deployed for engagement with rioters and protesters. This approach is aimed to lower the protesters' morale and resolve to confront police.

The cooperation with other organizations, such as the Basij, is key to perform plainclothes infiltration and snatch arrests of the riot leaders.

Ideology of the Special Units 
The Special Units Command of FARAJA is one of the most ideologized in the Iranian armed forces. According to Behnam Gholipour, field commanders motivate actions of their subordinate personnel by using religious justifications.

The ideology of the Special Units of the Iranian Law Enforcement Command is grounded on putting service members' trust in God and on relying on God's reward for their duty after the successful passing of the divine test.

See also 
 Iran protests
 Islamic Revolution Committees

References 

Special forces of Iran
Law Enforcement Command of Islamic Republic of Iran